Igor Lazić may refer to:

 Igor Lazič, Slovenian footballer
 Igor Lazić (footballer born 1967), Bosnian footballer
 Igor Lazić (ice hockey), Croatian ice hockey player
 Niggor (born Igor Lazić), Montenegrin hip-hop artist